Hot wax may refer to:

Hot Wax (album), by Grant Hart, 2009
Hot Wax Records, an American record label
"Hotwax", a song by Beck from Odelay, 1996
"Hot Wax", a song by King Gizzard & the Lizard Wizard from Oddments, 2014

See also
Waxing, a method of hair removal
Wax play, a form of sensual play
Encaustic painting, or hot wax painting
Wax
Waxing (disambiguation)